Latipes is a genus of air-breathing land slugs, terrestrial pulmonate gastropod mollusks in the family Veronicellidae, the leatherleaf slugs.

Species
Species within the genus Latipes include:
 Latipes pterocaulis

References

 Iphylo.org info on authority

Veronicellidae